Grafton and Burbage railway station served the villages of Burbage and East and West Grafton in Wiltshire, England. The station was on the Midland and South Western Junction Railway. It opened in May 1882 as the northern terminus of the southern section of the Swindon, Marlborough and Andover Railway and became a through station when the line from Swindon was completed through a new Marlborough station and the Great Western Railway's Savernake station in February 1883.

In 1883, a northwards extension, the Swindon and Cheltenham Extension Railway, opened from Swindon Town to Cirencester, with further northward extension to a junction with the Great Western Railway's Cheltenham to Banbury at Andoversford opening in 1891, enabling through trains from the Midlands to the south. The SM&AR and the S&CER amalgamated in 1884 to form the M&SWJR.

In 1898, a new section of line, called the Marlborough and Grafton Railway, was opened between the M&SWJR station in Marlborough and Grafton & Burbage station, with an intervening stop at a high level station at Savernake. This removed the need for M&SWJR trains to run on the GWR lines, though junctions to the GWR line heading both east and west were retained north of Grafton station.

Grafton and Burbage station was sited at West Grafton on a double-track section of the line. It had a small main building on the down platform (towards Andover), with a large signalbox that controlled what had become a complex junction. The up platform had a wooden shelter. There was a small goods yard to the north of the station. Station signs on the platforms referred to it as "Grafton" station; in timetables and on other printed material, however, it always appeared as "Grafton and Burbage".

As a whole, traffic on the M&SWJR fell steeply after the Second World War and the line closed to passengers in 1961, with goods facilities withdrawn from this section of the line at the same time. The station building has now been incorporated into a larger residential house, with the space between the platforms where the track ran forming part of the garden.

Routes

References

 Wiltshire Railway Stations, Mike Oakley, Dovecote Press, Wimborne, 2004, 

Disused railway stations in Wiltshire
Former Midland and South Western Junction Railway stations
Railway stations in Great Britain opened in 1882
Railway stations in Great Britain closed in 1961